The United States Army, United States Navy, United States Marine Corps, United States Air Force and its predecessors, and United States Coast Guard operated aircraft when specific alphanumerical designation systems were not in use; these aircraft were referred to by their manufacturers' designations. There were also aircraft in service later that did not receive designations for other reasons, such as foreign military aircraft used for testing or special operations, and civil aircraft purchased off-the-shelf or impressed into service.

For aircraft of the Air Force and its preceding Army air services after the introduction of the 1919 United States Army Air Service aircraft designation system, see the list of United States Air Force aircraft designations (1919–1962). For Navy and Marine Corps aircraft that received designations from 1911–1917 and post–1922 United States Navy aircraft designation system, see the list of United States Navy aircraft designations (pre-1962). For the Army designation system used from 1956 to 1962, after the creation of the Air Force, see 1956 United States Army aircraft designation system. For all United States military aircraft after the implementation of the unified 1962 United States Tri-Service aircraft designation system, see list of United States Tri-Service aircraft designations.

Army 
This list includes aircraft operated by the United States Army, Army Signal Corps, and American Expeditionary Forces.

Air Force 

This list includes aircraft operated by the United States Air Force and its predecessors; the United States Army Air Service (USAAS), and United States Army Air Corps (USAAC), and United States Army Air Forces (USAAF).

Navy, Marine Corps and Coast Guard 

This list includes aircraft operated by the United States Navy, United States Marine Corps and United States Coast Guard.

Aviation in the Marine Corps and Coast Guard has historically been subsidiary to naval aviation, with Marine Corps aircraft being procured by the Navy. Many Coast Guard aircraft have been procured from the Navy or the Air Force and its predecessors, typically carrying designations conforming to equivalent types operated by those services, but the Coast Guard has also independently obtained several aircraft types without a military designation or an equivalent.

Although the Navy's rigid airships were given designations, its other lighter-than-air craft often were not. Until the 1940s, Navy blimps were grouped into classes by nominal power and size; within each class, individual aircraft often had significant design variations, and were sometimes sourced from different manufacturers. Spherical crewed free gas balloons used for airship crew training were considered ZF-class aircraft but categorically never received formal designations and were identified only by serial number and volume; similarly, crewed kite balloons and uncrewed barrage balloons were considered ZK-class, but were undesignated.

See also
 United States military aircraft designation systems
 List of active United States military aircraft
 List of military aircraft of the United States
 List of United States Navy aircraft designations (pre-1962)
 List of U.S. DoD aircraft designations
 United States military aircraft engine designations
 United States military aircraft serials

References

Citations

Bibliography

External links
 OrBat United States of America - MilAvia Press.com: Military Aviation Publications
 Designation-Systems.Net
 American Military Aircraft
 Main Aircraft Page
 National Museum of the USAF
 OrBat United States Air Force - MilAvia Press.com: Military Aviation Publications
 Brown-Shoe Navy: U.S. Naval Aviation

United States, List of military aircraft of
Aircraft